Gyeongju National Park is located in the province of Gyeongsangbuk-do, South Korea, and is the country's only historical national park. It was first designated a national park in 1968. The park covers many of the principal Silla historical sites in Gyeongju City. It is divided into several non-contiguous sections:  Gumisan and Danseoksan sections to the west of the city center; Hwarang, Seo-ak, Sogeumgang, and Namsan sections in the heart of Gyeongju; Tohamsan section to the east, and Daebon section on the coast of the Sea of Japan (East Sea).

References

External links
The park's page on Korea National Park Service's website

Parks in North Gyeongsang Province
National parks of South Korea
Protected areas established in 1968